The Detachment of the Military Police for Special Operations "Cobras" is a military police unit of the Serbian Armed Forces directly subordinated to the General Staff. The unit is responsible for close protection, counter-terrorism and special operations.

History
The unit was first established by the order of the Federal Secretary of People's Defence Nikola Ljubičić on 14 April 1978. The unit was included in a special 'Anti-terrorist Department' within the 282nd battalion of the Yugoslav People's Army (JNA). In 1985 the department expanded and transformed into a 'Anti-terrorist platoon' within the Guard Brigade. In 1992 it was transferred to the Special Units Corps of newly-formed Armed Forces of Serbia and Montenegro, which included the 63rd Parachute Brigade, 72nd Reconnaissance-Commando Battalion and 1st Guard Brigade. In 2000 the unit was placed under the direct command of the Chief of General Staff. The unit further expanded, with the help of colonel Stojan Kljajić who commanded the unit until 2005. In this period the symbol of a winged cobra twisted around a sword was adopted. It was organized as an anti-terrorist detachment in 2006 and has been since a component of the Military Police. Since 2013 a number of women have been included in the unit.

Missions
The unit consists of a detachment of 100 members and its main responsibilities in recent years include personal and technical protection of the President of Serbia, Minister of Defence and Chief of the General Staff.

See also
 Special forces of Serbia
 List of military special forces units

References

External links
 Military Police Battalion Cobra  at specijalne-jedinice.com 
 VSCG SPECIAL FORCES

Cobras
Military units and formations established in 1978
Battalions of Serbia
Military police
Counterterrorist organizations
Military provosts